Charles Gorman (1865 – January 25, 1928), was an American actor of the silent era. He appeared in more than 80 films between 1908 and 1929. He died in New York City. He was part of an act called "The Gorman Brothers". They performed in vaudeville with many stage and future film stars such Marie Dressler.

Selected filmography

 The Fatal Hour (1908)
 For Love of Gold (1908)
 For a Wife's Honor (1908)
 Father Gets in the Game (1908)
 An Awful Moment (1908)
 The Cord of Life (1909)
 The Girls and Daddy (1909)
 At the Altar (1909)
 The Blind Princess and the Poet (1911) 
 The Old Bookkeeper (1912) 
 Under Burning Skies (1912) 
 The Goddess of Sagebrush Gulch (1912) 
 The Lesser Evil (1912) 
 A Temporary Truce (1912) 
 The Inner Circle (1912) 
 With the Enemy's Help (1912) 
 The Chief's Blanket (1912) 
 The Painted Lady (1912) 
 A Sailor's Heart (1912) 
 The God Within (1912) 
 Broken Ways (1913) 
 The Left-Handed Man (1913) 
 A Timely Interception (1913) 
 Red Hicks Defies the World (1913) 
 The Enemy's Baby (1913) 
 The Mistake (1913) 
 When Love Forgives (1913) 
 The Battle at Elderbush Gulch (1913) 
 The Yaqui Cur (1913)
 Almost a Wild Man (1913)
 The Massacre (1914)
 The Electric Alarm (1915)
 Let Katie Do It (1916)
 A Sister of Six (1916)
 The Children of the Feud (1916)
 The Babes in the Woods (1917)
 Treasure Island (1918)
The Devil Within (1921)
 Bare Knuckles (1921)
 The Gay Retreat (1927)
 The Far Call (1929)

References

External links

1865 births
1928 deaths
American male film actors
American male silent film actors
20th-century American male actors
19th-century American people